Ane Brun (born Ane Brunvoll on 10 March 1976) is a Norwegian songwriter, guitarist, and vocalist of Sami origin. Since 2003, she has recorded ten albums, eight of which are studio albums of original material (including a collection of duets), an acoustic album, and a covers album; she has also released three live albums, two compilations, one live DVD, and four EPs. She has lived in Stockholm, Sweden, since 2001, where she writes, records, and runs her own label (Balloon Ranger Recordings).

Early life and education
Ane Brunvoll is the daughter of lawyer Knut Anker Brunvoll (b. 1945) and jazz singer and pianist Inger Johanne Brunvoll (b. Kvien 1945). She grew up in a musical family in Molde, Norway. Her younger sister is singer Mari Kvien Brunvoll (b. 1984). Her older brother is photographer Bjørn Brunvoll (b. 1973).

In 1995, she moved to study at the University of Bergen, jumping between courses in Spanish, law, and music. In Bergen, she began writing her own material. She spent the next few years moving between Barcelona, Oslo, and Bergen while making a living working in record shops and bars.

Career
After playing a few minor shows and recording her first demos in Bergen in 1999, she moved to Sweden, first to Uppsala and then to Stockholm in 2001, where she started to take her musical career seriously.

Brun recorded her debut album, Spending Time with Morgan, in 2002 in both Stockholm and back in Uppsala, with engineers and producers Katharina Nuttall, Cécile Grudet, and Kim Nelson. It was released on the DetErMine label, which she formed with Ellekari Larsson from the Swedish band The Tiny. The album was released in 11 European countries in 2003 through a licence/distribution deal with V2 Music.

Touring, 2002–2007

After releasing her first album, Brun toured around Europe but soon took some time out. She had been working intensively for two years and felt somewhat burnt out and in need of a break. After a six-month breather, she started touring around Europe again and within the next year had her second album ready. A Temporary Dive was again produced by Katharina Nuttall and was released in 2005 throughout Europe, followed by the UK and the US in 2006, and in Japan in 2007. This album took the darker themes of Spending Time With Morgan further, through songs like "The Fight Song" and title track "A Temporary Dive", but there was also space for the lighter "Song No. 6", a duet with Ron Sexsmith.

A Temporary Dive was well received all over the world, picking up good reviews in magazines and newspapers from Time magazine to The Independent. She received award nominations from all over Europe too, and that year took home the Spellemannpris, the Norwegian equivalent of the Grammies, for Best Female Artist.

After enjoying the collaboration on the previous few duets she had recorded, Brun was inspired to ask some artists whom she adored to sing with her on a full album called Duets. This album was released in November 2005 and besides another recording with Ron Sexsmith, it also included songs with artists such as Syd Matters and Teitur. The collaboration with the band Madrugada on the single "Lift Me" gained her another Norwegian Grammy.

Brun spent much of the next couple of years touring the world in many different stage arrangements. She has played with a full band including string section, just herself and string section at times, sometimes just a cello, and one backing vocalist or three. She often ends up coming back to solo acoustic guitar performances. "There is something about the focus in playing by myself that fascinates me", she says. "There’s nothing to hide behind when I'm alone on stage and it becomes almost meditative for me when I play."

One of her tours was with a string quintet, recorded and released as Live in Scandinavia (2007) and featured Nina Kinert and the guitarist Staffan Johansson. It includes songs from Brun's first two albums with new string arrangements by Malene Bay-Foged.

Later work, 2008–2013

In 2008, Brun released her third studio album, Changing of the Seasons, which was produced by Valgeir Sigurðsson. It included string arrangements by American composer Nico Muhly (Antony and the Johnsons, Grizzly Bear, The Reader soundtrack). Later the same year came the album Sketches, which included acoustic demo versions of the songs from Changing of the Seasons. The Sketches tour featured a stripped down, sparse sound, this time touring with musicians Rebekka Karijord, Jennie Abrahamson, and Linnea Olsson; there were memorable gigs in places such as the Union Chapel in London.

Back on the road, a concert at the Stockholm Concert Hall was filmed and released as an album and live DVD in 2009. Later that year, Brun organised the No More Lullabies concert to bring attention to the issues of climate justice. She assembled 24 well-known Swedish artists such as Robyn, Loney, Dear, Titiyo, and Benny Andersson of ABBA to take part in seven hours of live music and visuals to mark the International Day of Climate Action on 24 October 2009. They succeeded in drawing attention to the issue before the upcoming COP15 conference.

Brun featured as one of the guests on Peter Gabriel's 2011 studio album New Blood, singing Kate Bush's part on the re-recorded version of "Don't Give Up", recorded in 2010. She was subsequently invited to perform with him as support act and back-up singer on the New Blood tour throughout 2010.

In late 2011, Brun released her sixth studio album, It All Starts with One, produced by Tobias Fröberg.

On 11 March 2013, Brun performed her own adaptation of Dido's Lament, from Dido and Aeneas by Henry Purcell, at The Roundhouse in London.

In May 2013, Brun released a 32-track collection of songs from her first 10 years in the music industry, entitled Songs 2003–2013, which included four new songs.
In October 2013, she released a 20-track collection of covers and outtakes entitled Rarities without pre-promotion.

2015–2020
In 2015, Brun released her seventh studio album, titled When I'm Free. This was followed in 2017 by Leave Me Breathless, a collection of covers of songs by diverse artists including Foreigner, Mariah Carey, and Radiohead. In 2020, the artist released two albums of original material in close succession. At first intended to be a double album, they were issued separately as After the Great Storm in October and How Beauty Holds the Hand of Sorrow in November. The two albums were nominated for IMPALA's European Independent Album of the Year Award.

Personal life
Brun was diagnosed with lupus erythematosus at the age of 27, and a lupus flareup in 2012 had her cancel a North American tour with Peter Gabriel.

Discography

Albums
Studio albums

Live albums

Compilations

EPs
 2001: What I Want
 2001: Wooden Body
 2004: My Lover Will Go
 2012: Do You Remember

DVDs
 2009: Live at Stockholm Concert Hall (also released as an album in Sweden)

Singles

Main artist

Featured artist

Also appears on
 Songs of the Siren (Starbucks Hear Music, 2013)
 Beginner's Guide to Scandinavia 3-CD album (2011)
 "Don't Give Up" New Blood (Peter Gabriel, 2011)
 "Don't Give Up" Live Blood (Peter Gabriel, 2012)
 In My Last Life (Andrew Bayer, 2018)''

References

External links

 

1976 births
Norwegian singer-songwriters
Spellemannprisen winners
English-language singers from Norway
Norwegian expatriates in Sweden
Musicians from Molde
Living people
21st-century Norwegian singers
21st-century Norwegian women singers
Feminist musicians